24-Hour Call was a 1963 British television series for ATV around the private practice of four doctors played by Godfrey Quigley as Dr Bennett and Geoffrey Frederick from a previous ATV series Call Oxbridge 2000, and newcomers Scott Forbes and Andrew Downie.

References

1963 British television series debuts